Commiphora habessinica, sometimes known as Abyssinian myrrh or the Yemen myrrh, is a plant native to northeast Africa and the Arabian peninsula, including Djibouti, Eritrea, Ethiopia, Zambia, Malawi, Oman and Yemen. It was first described by Otto Karl Berg in 1862 as Balsamodendrum habessinicum from northeast Africa. It was then transferred to the genus Commiphora by Adolf Engler in 1883, but given the name Commiphora abyssinica, an orthographical variant.  It can be recognised by its simple, serrate leaves and by the pseudo aril, covering the seed, which has four almost linear arm-like lobes.

Description
Commiphora habessinica is a widespread species and it varies greatly in appearance between drier areas and those most affected by the monsoon.  The plant varies dramatically from low, spiny shrubs with small leaves in the drier areas to medium size, unarmed trees with a distinct trunk and large leaves in areas affected by the monsoon.  It is dioecious, with bark peeling of flaking and when cut it oozes a pleasant smelling resin.  The leaves alternate or are fascicled on short condensed side shoots.  The leaves are 10-50mm long x 5-40mm across with an acute tip and glossy green colour.  The flowers are red or yellow and there are usually 1–5 on the side shoots amongst the leaves.  Male and female flowers are similar but male flowers are usually in groups whereas female flowers are usually solitary.  The fruit is ovoid, 7-9 x 4-6mm, green and red coloured and 1-seeded splitting into 2 valves.  The seed is orange or pale yellow with 4-lobed pseudo aril.

Traditional uses

The resin, also called myrrh of Commiphora habessinica, was used in traditional medicine in Arabia. A small quantity would be painted over the body area to be treated.

Commiphora habessinica is also edible. A young plant with the root peeled and chewed produces a sweet, refreshing liquid. After monsoons or rainstorms, the Commiphora habbesinica produces a sugary liquid. The plant can then be cut in cross sections and sucked for its fluid.

References

habessinica
Plants described in 1862